Anthony Hamilton (born August 26, 1985) is an American soccer player.

Career

College and amateur
Hamilton played college soccer for University of California, Irvine, featuring in 70 games during his four seasons, amassing 23 goals and 7 assists. During his college years he also played for Orange County Blue Star in the USL Premier Development League. Hamilton earned his bachelor's degree in 2010 from the University of California, Irvine in Literary Journalism.

Professional
Hamilton participated in Chivas USA's player combine in December 2006 at the Home Depot Center prior to being drafted by them with the 31st overall pick of the 2007 MLS Supplemental Draft.

He was released by Chivas in February 2009, having played just 7 games for the team, and subsequently signed for Ventura County Fusion of the USL Premier Development League for the 2009 season.

Hamilton signed with Rochester Rhinos on February 16, 2010. After two seasons with Rochester, Hamilton signed with NSC Minnesota Stars of the North American Soccer League on September 6, 2011.

Honors

Rochester Rhinos
USSF Division 2 Pro League Regular Season Champions (1): 2010

Ventura County Fusion
USL Premier Development League Champions (1): 2009

References

External links
 Anthony Hamilton at Yahoo! Sports
 Anthony Hamilton at World Soccer Stats

1985 births
Living people
American soccer players
Association football forwards
Chivas USA draft picks
Chivas USA players
Major League Soccer players
Minnesota United FC (2010–2016) players
North American Soccer League players
Orange County Blue Star players
People from Redlands, California
Rochester New York FC players
Soccer players from California
UC Irvine Anteaters men's soccer players
USL Championship players
USL League Two players
USSF Division 2 Professional League players
Ventura County Fusion players